Anijsmelk is a Dutch drink consisting of hot milk flavored with anise seed and sweetened with sugar. One traditional use takes place during ice skating. Anijsmelk is also said to have a soporific effect. The drink (which, outside the Netherlands, is consumed by expats in, for instance, Michigan and South Africa) can be made from scratch, but it is more common to use tablets called anijsblokjes, made with anise flavoring and sugar; the tablets are dissolved in hot milk. Anijsblokjes are made by the company De Ruijter and have been produced since at least the 19th century. However, the machine that was used to make these aniseed and sugar blocks broke down and was irreparable due to age. Since then, the product has been sold in powder sachets.

See also

 List of hot beverages

References

External links
Anijsblokjes by De Ruijter, containing nutritional information

Dutch drinks
Flavored milk
Hot drinks